This is a list of child actors from India. Films and/or television series they appeared in are mentioned only if they were still a child at the time of filming.

Current child actors (under the age of eighteen) are indicated by boldface.

A 
Anand Krishnamoorthi (born 1980) (credited as Kutty Anand)
Anjali (1990)
May Madham (1994)
Sathi Leelavathi (1995)
Aasai (1995)
 Aarav Dua

D 
Bobby Deol (born 1969)
Dharam Veer (1977)
Daisy Irani (born 1952)
Ek Hi Raasta (1956)
Naya Daur (1957)
Hum Panchhi Ek Daal Ke (1957)
Jailor (1958)
Qaidi No 911 (1959)
Do Ustad (1959)

G 
Bhavya Gandhi (born 1997)
Taarak Mehta Ka Ooltah Chashmah (2008 to 2017)

H 
Harish Kumar (born 1975)
Sansar (1971)
Ek Hi Bhool (1979)
Premabhishekam (1981)
Kondaveeti Simham (1981)
Trishulam (1982)
Jeevan Dhaara (1982)
Farz Aur Kanoon (1982)
Andha Kanoon (1983)
Donga (1985)
Kamal Haasan (born 1954)
Kalathur Kannamma (1959)
Paadha Kannikkai (1962)
Kannum Karalum (1962)
Vaanampadi (1963)
Anandha Jodhi (1963)

J 
Farida Jalal (born 1949)

K 
Shashi Kapoor (born 1938)
Aag (1948)
Awaara (1951)
Ayesha Kapur (born 1994)
Black (2005 film)
Ashnoor Kaur (born 2004)
Jhansi Ki Rani (2008 to 2011)
Shobha Somnath Ki (2011 to 2012)
Na Bole Tum Na Maine Kuch Kaha (2012 to 2013)
manmarziyaan (2018)
Aamir Khan (born 1965)
Yaadon Ki Baaraat (1973)
Madhosh (1974)
Imran Khan (born 1983)
Qayamat Se Qayamat Tak (1988)
Jo Jeeta Wohi Sikandar (1992)
Kunal Khemu (born 1983)
Hum Hain Rahi Pyar Ke (1993)
Raja Hindustani (1996)
Bhai (1997)
Zakhm (1998)

M 
Meena Kumari (1933―1972)
Leatherface (1939)
Pooja (1940)
Bahen (1941)
Lal Haveli (1944)
Madhubala (1933―1969)
Basant (1942)
Mumtaz Mahal (1944)
Phoolwari (1946)
Master Manjunath (born 1976)
Malgudi Days (1987)
Agneepath (1990 film) (1990)
Urmila Matondkar (born 1974)
Kalyug (1980)
Masoom (1983)
Bhavna (1984)
Dacait (1987)
Bade Ghar Ki Beti (1989)
Hansika Motwani (born 1991)
Escape from Taliban (2003)
Hawa (2003)
Koi... Mil Gaya (2003)
Aabra Ka Daabra (2004)
Jaago (2004)
Hum Kaun Hai? (2004)
Kyunki Saas Bhi Kabhi Bahu Thi (2003)
Des Mein Niklla Hoga Chand (2003)
Karishma Kaa Karishma (2003)
Sonpari (2003)
Shaka Laka Boom Boom (2001–03)

N 
Nargis (1929―1981)
Talashe Haq (1935)
Sonu Nigam (born 1973)
Pyaara Dushman (1980)
Kaamchor (1982)
Ustadi Ustad Se (1982)
Betaab (1983)
Hum Se Hai Zamana (1983)
Taqdeer (1983)

P 
Puneeth Rajkumar (born 1975)
Premada Kanike (1976)
Sanaadi Appanna (1977)
Vasantha Geetha (1980)
Bhagyavantha (1981)
Thayige Thakka Maga (1981)
Bhoomige Banda Bhagavantha (1981)
Hosa Belaku (1982)
Chalisuva Modagalu (1982)
Bhakta Prahlada (1983)
Eradu Nakshatragalu (1983)
Yarivanu (1984)
Bettada Hoovu (1985)
Shiva Mecchida Kannappa (1988)
Parashuram (1989)
Parashuram (1989)
Pritam Priyadarshni (2019)
Prachi Kadam (born 2005)
Malaal (2019)

R 
Saroja Ramamrutham (born 1931)
Balayogini (1937)
Ratan Kumar (1941―2016) 
Baiju Bawra (1952)
Do Bigha Zameen (1953)
Boot Polish (1953)
Roja Ramani (born 1959)
Bhakta Prahlada (1967)
Iru Malargal (1967)
Ethiroli (1970)
Enga Mama (1970)
Ramalayam (1971)
Apna Desh (1972)
Chembarathy (1972)
Panitheeratha Veedu (1973)
Paruva Kaalam (1974)
En Magan (1974)
O Seeta Katha (1974)
Bali Peetam (1975)
Hrithik Roshan (born 1974)
Aasha (1980)
Aap Ke Deewane (1980)
Bhagwan Dada (1986)

S 
Sucheta Trivedi (born 1976) 
Woh Saat Din (1983)
Sajid Khan (born 1951)
Mother India (1957)
Son of India
Maya
 Fatima Sana Shaikh (born 1992)
 Ishq (1997)
 Chachi 420 (1997)
 Bade Dilwala (1999)
T. R. Silambarasan (born 1983)
Oru Thayin Sabhatham (1987)
En Thangai Kalyani (1988)
Samsara Sangeetham (1989)
Shanti Enathu Shanti (1991)
Enga Veetu Velan (1992)
Sabash Babu (1993)
Pettredutha Pillai (1993)
Rajadi Rajavan (1993)
Oru Vasantha Geetham (1994)
Thai Thangai Paasam (1995)
Neetu Singh (born 1958)
Suraj (1966)
Dus Lakh (1966)
Do Kaliyaan (1968)
Ghar Ghar Ki Kahani (1970)
Pavitra Paapi (1970)
Sridevi (born 1963)
Bala Bharatam (1972)
Bhakta Tukaram (1973)
Badi Panthulu (1972)
Yashoda Krishna (1975)
Julie (1975)
Suresh Gopi (born 1958)
Odeyil Ninnu (1965)

T
Tabassum (born 1944)
Bari Behen (1949)
Jogan (1950)
Deedar (1951)
Baiju Bawra (1952)

W 

 Zaira Wasim (born 2000)
 Dangal (2016)
 Secret Superstar (2017)

List
India
child actors